There were a number of groups in Iraq opposed to the regime of Saddam Hussein.

They can be roughly divided into three groups:
Shi'a groups in the south
Kurds in the north, organizing in Iraqi Kurdistan since 1991
Arab opposition groups suppressed in Baghdad
Groups include:
the umbrella group Iraqi National Congress
Three Kurdish factions:
Kurdistan Democratic Party
Patriotic Union of Kurdistan
Kurdistan Islamic Movement
the monarchist group Iraqi Constitutional Monarchy
the Iraqi National Accord
the Iran-supported Iraqi Shi'a groups Islamic Supreme Council of Iraq and Islamic Dawa Party
the Democratic July 14 Movement
the pro-Syrian faction of the Arab Socialist Ba'ath Party
the Iraqi Communist Party

Iraq War
Iraqi democracy movements
Modern history of Iraq
Political history of Iraq
Politics of Iraq
Resistance movements